Paya is a traditional food from South Asia. It is served at various festivals and gatherings, or made for special guests. Paya means 'leg'/'feet' in Hindi/Urdu. The main ingredients of the dish are the trotters (hooves) of a cow, goat, buffalo or sheep; cooked with various spices.

Origins
The paya originated from the amalgamation of South Asian and Central Asian cuisine. The dish was adapted by the cooks of Lahore, Hyderabad of Telangana State and Lucknow.

Subsequently, paya became popular all over present-day India, Pakistan and Bangladesh. Outside of the Indian subcontinent, paya is available in restaurants that serve South Asian cuisine. In Delhi, it is sometimes also referred to as khurode from the word khur meaning foot or hoof. The Hindi word khur is itself derived from Sanskrit khura.

Recipes

Recipes for this dish vary regionally. The soup base is created by sautéed onions and garlic, where a number of curry-based spices are then added to the meat and bones. The cooked dish is served with a garnish of fresh diced ginger and fresh long coriander leaves, along with fresh sliced lemon.

Cooking methods
It is cooked on mild heat for hours (usually overnight) on the stove. However, nowadays it is mostly cooked in a pressure cooker.

Historically, when people used wood or coal as a cooking fuel, preparation of this dish would start at night, slow cooking it in the coals until the morning. This dish has a soup-like consistency and is usually eaten as a breakfast food in the winter months with naan.

Variations
There are many variations of this dish. A popular one is siri paya (سری پایا, सिरी पाया), where siri means the head of an animal. It is considered a delicacy.

See also

 Haleem
 List of stews
 Nihari
 Punjabi cuisine

References

Indian curries
Indian cuisine
Lahori cuisine
Pakistani curries
Pakistani meat dishes
Pakistani soups and stews
Punjabi cuisine
Telangana cuisine
Mughlai cuisine
Beef dishes
Goat dishes